Eunoe tritoni is a scale worm described from the Færö Channel in the North Atlantic Ocean.

Description
Number of segments 37 (probably); elytra 15 pairs (presumably). No distinct pigmentation pattern. Prostomium anterior margin comprising a pair of acute anterior projections. Lateral antennae inserted ventrally (beneath prostomium and median antenna). elytra marginal fringe of papillae present. Notochaetae about as thick as neurochaetae. Bidentate neurochaetae absent.

References

Phyllodocida